Ferdinand Duchoň (born 15 May 1938) is a former Czech cyclist. He competed in the team pursuit at the 1960 Summer Olympics.

References

External links
 

1938 births
Living people
Czech male cyclists
Olympic cyclists of Czechoslovakia
Cyclists at the 1960 Summer Olympics
Sportspeople from Brno